Milan Harvilko (born 18 July 1988) is a Slovak football defender who currently plays for his home-grown club MŠK Tesla Stropkov.

Career
He made his Corgoň Liga debut for MFK Dubnica against MFK Košice on 13 May 2010.

External links
at zpfutbal.sk
at eurofotbal.cz

References

1988 births
Living people
Slovak footballers
Association football defenders
MŠK Tesla Stropkov players
FK Dubnica players
FK Slovan Duslo Šaľa players
FK Železiarne Podbrezová players
Expatriate footballers in Austria
Slovak Super Liga players
People from Stropkov
Sportspeople from the Prešov Region